Light My Fire is an album by Hungarian jazz guitarist Gábor Szabó and American record producer Bob Thiele featuring performances recorded in 1967 for the Impulse! label.

Track listing
All compositions by Gábor Szabó except as indicated
 "Forest Flower" (Charles Lloyd) - 5:14
 "Rainy Day Woman #12 & 35" (Bob Dylan) - 2:30
 "Krishna" - 3:35
 "Light My Fire" (Jim Morrison, Ray Manzarek, John Densmore, Robby Krieger) -  6:16
 "Fakin' It" (Paul Simon) - 5:50
 "Eight Miles High" (David Crosby, Gene Clark, Roger McGuinn) - 7:02
 "Sophisticated Wheels" - 5:31
Recorded in Los Angeles, California on August 11, 1967 (tracks 1 & 4) and September 14, 1967 (tracks 2, 3 & 5-7).

Personnel
Gábor Szabó - guitar
Bob Thiele - director
Ollie Mitchell, Ray Triscari (tracks 1 & 4), Jimmy Zito (tracks 1 & 4), Gary Barone (tracks 2, 3 & 5-7), Bud Brisbois (tracks 2, 3 & 5-7) - trumpet
Lew McCreary, Mike Barone (tracks 1 & 4), Dick Leith (tracks 2, 3 & 5-7) - trombone
Howard Johnson - tuba (tracks 1 & 4)
Buddy Collette (tracks 1 & 4), Bob Hardaway (tracks 1 & 4), Bud Shank (tracks 1 & 4) - alto saxophone, tenor saxophone, flute
Tom Scott - tenor saxophone
Lincoln Mayorga - piano, harpsichord (tracks 1 & 4)
Mike Melvoin - piano, organ, harpsichord (tracks 2, 3 & 5-7)
Bill Plummer - sitar
Dennis Budimir, Louis Morell - rhythm guitar
Max Bennett (tracks 1 & 4), Carol Kaye (tracks 2, 3 & 5-7) - electric bass
Jim Gordon (tracks 1 & 4), John Guerin (tracks 2, 3  5-7) - drums
Gary Coleman (tracks 1 & 4), Emil Richards (tracks 2, 3 & 5-7) - percussion
Sid Feller - arranger
The California Dreamers: Ron Hicklin, Al Capps, Loren Farber, John Bahler, Tom Bahler, Ian Freebairn-Smith, Sally Stevens, Sue Allen, Jackie Ward - vocals (track 2)

References

Impulse! Records albums
Gábor Szabó albums
1967 albums
Albums produced by Bob Thiele
Albums arranged by Sid Feller
Collaborative albums